Katherine Johnson (born December 18, 1978 in Denver, Colorado) is an American rower who won a silver medal at the Athens 2004 Olympic Games in the women's eight. Johnson and her team won gold at the World Rowing Cups in Munich and Lucerne in 2004 prior to competing at the Olympic games. At the FISA World Rowing Championships in 2002, Johnson won the gold medal and World Championship title in the women's eight.

Johnson competed on nine U.S. National Rowing Teams during her career making her first international team at age 15.  She also competed for the University of Michigan, from which she graduated in 2001.  She was a three-time All-America honoree while at Michigan (1999–2001), and Big Ten Rower of the Year in both 2000 and 2001.  She was inducted into the University of Michigan Hall of Honor in 2016.

See also
 Caryn Davies
 Mary Whipple
 Anna Mickelson
 Laurel Korholz

References

External links 
 University of Michigan Bentley Museum
 Right To Play- Kate Johnson Athlete Ambassador
 Women's Sports Foundation Kate Johnson
 ESPN Magazine "Tying Up The Olympics"
 USA Today USOC Charity Program
 Go Girl Go! Learn To Row

1978 births
Living people
Olympic silver medalists for the United States in rowing
Rowers at the 2004 Summer Olympics
Sportspeople from Denver
American female rowers
University of Michigan alumni
Medalists at the 2004 Summer Olympics
World Rowing Championships medalists for the United States
21st-century American women